The Young Christian Democrats of Czech Republic was a political organization and one of the youth wings of Christian and Democratic Union – Czechoslovak People's Party. It was founded in 1998 a JuniorClub. It changed its name to the Young Christian Democrats of Czech Republic in 2004. Organization was dissolved on 6 June 2021 when it merged into another youth wing, the Young Populars.

Footnotes

External links
  Young Christian Democrats Official Website

Politics of the Czech Republic
Youth politics
1998 establishments in the Czech Republic
2021 disestablishments in the Czech Republic
Youth wings of political parties in the Czech Republic
KDU-ČSL
Youth wings of conservative parties